Kiji may refer to:

 KIJI, a radio station in Guam
 Kijji, an island in Mauritania
 Aba Kiji, a clan of the Shor people of Russia
 Japanese torpedo boat Kiji, two Japanese warships

See also
Kijiji, an online classified advertising service